John Grant High School is a high school located in Côte Saint-Luc, Quebec, Canada and a part of the English Montreal School Board (EMSB).

It was previously a part of the Protestant School Board of Greater Montreal.

References

External links
John Grant High School Home Page

High schools in Montreal
English-language schools in Quebec
English Montreal School Board
Côte Saint-Luc